Right Ho, Jeeves is a novel by P. G. Wodehouse, the second full-length novel featuring the popular characters Jeeves and Bertie Wooster, after Thank You, Jeeves. It was first published in the United Kingdom on 5 October 1934 by Herbert Jenkins, London, and in the United States on 15 October 1934 by Little, Brown and Company, Boston, under the title Brinkley Manor.<ref name=McIl>{{cite book |last1=McIlvaine |first1=E |last2=Sherby |first2=L S |last3=Heineman |first3=J H |year=1990 |title=P.G. Wodehouse: A comprehensive bibliography and checklist. |location=New York |publisher=James H Heineman |pages=66–68 |isbn=087008125X}}</ref> It had also been sold to the Saturday Evening Post, in which it appeared in serial form from 23 December 1933 to 27 January 1934, and in England in the Grand Magazine from April to September 1934. Wodehouse had already started planning this sequel while working on Thank You, Jeeves.

The story is mostly set at Brinkley Court, the home of Bertie's Aunt Dahlia, and introduces the recurring characters Gussie Fink-Nottle and Madeline Bassett. Bertie's friend Tuppy Glossop and cousin Angela Travers also feature in the novel, as does Brinkley Court's prized chef, Anatole.

Plot
Bertie returns to London from several weeks in Cannes spent in the company of his Aunt Dahlia Travers and her daughter Angela. In Bertie's absence, Jeeves has been advising Bertie's old school friend, Gussie Fink-Nottle, who is in love with a goofy, sentimental, whimsical, childish girl named Madeline Bassett. Gussie, a shy teetotaler with a passion for newts and a face like a fish, is too timid to speak to her. Bertie is annoyed that his friends consider Jeeves more intelligent than Bertie, and he takes Gussie's case in hand, ordering Jeeves not to offer any more advice.

Madeline, a friend of Bertie's cousin Angela, is staying at Brinkley Court (country seat of Aunt Dahlia and Uncle Tom). Aunt Dahlia demands that Bertie come to Brinkley Court to make a speech and present the school prizes to students at the local grammar school, which he considers a fearsome task. Bertie sends Gussie to Brinkley Court in his place, so that Gussie will have the chance to woo Madeline there, but also so that Gussie will be forced to take on the unpleasant job of distributing the school prizes.

When Angela breaks her engagement to Tuppy Glossop, Bertie feels obliged to go down to Brinkley Court to comfort Aunt Dahlia. In addition to her worry about Angela's broken engagement, Aunt Dahlia is anxious because she has lost 500 pounds gambling at Cannes, and now needs to ask her miserly husband Tom to replace the money in order to keep financing her magazine, Milady's Boudoir. Bertie advises her to arouse Uncle Tom's concern for her by pretending to have lost her appetite through worry. He offers similar advice to Tuppy, to win back Angela. He also offers the same advice to Gussie, to show his love for Madeline. All take his advice, and the resulting return of plates of untasted food upsets Aunt Dahlia's temperamental prized chef Anatole, who gives notice to quit. Not unreasonably, Aunt Dahlia blames Bertie for this disaster.

When Bertie attempts to probe Madeline's feelings about Gussie, she misinterprets his questioning as a marriage proposal on his own behalf. To his relief, she tells Bertie she cannot marry him, as she has fallen in love with Gussie. Bertie relays the good news to Gussie, but even with this encouragement, Gussie remains too timid to propose, and Bertie decides to embolden him by lacing his orange juice with liquor.

Gussie ends up imbibing more liquor than Bertie had intended. Under its influence, Gussie successfully proposes to Madeline. He then delivers a hilarious, abusive, drunken speech to the grammar school while presenting the school prizes. Madeline, disgusted, breaks the engagement and resolves to marry Bertie instead. The prospect of spending his life with the drippy Madeline terrifies Bertie, but his personal code of chivalrous behavior will not allow him to insult her by withdrawing his "proposal" and turning her down. Meanwhile, Gussie, still drunk, retaliates against Madeline by proposing to Angela, who accepts him in order to score off Tuppy. Tuppy's jealousy is aroused and he chases Gussie all around the mansion, vowing to beat him within an inch of his life.

In the face of this chaos, Bertie admits his inability to cope, and appeals to Jeeves for advice. Jeeves arranges for Bertie to be absent for a few hours, and during that time swiftly and ingeniously solves all the problems, assuring that Angela and Tuppy are reconciled, that Gussie and Madeline become engaged again, that Anatole withdraws his resignation, and that Uncle Tom writes Aunt Dahlia a cheque for 500 pounds. Bertie learns his lesson and resolves to let Jeeves have his way in the future.

Style

Like the preceding novel Thank You, Jeeves, Right Ho, Jeeves uses Bertie's rebellion against Jeeves to create strong plot conflict that is sustained through most of the story. Writer Kristin Thompson refers to these two novels as Bertie's "rebellious period", which ends when Jeeves reasserts his authority at the end of Right Ho, Jeeves. This period serves as a transition between the sustained action of the short stories and the later Jeeves novels, which generally use a more episodic problem-solution structure.

While Edwardian elements persist in Wodehouse's stories, for instance the popularity of gentlemen's clubs like the Drones Club, there are nevertheless references to contemporary events, as with a floating timeline. For example, in Right Ho, Jeeves, chapter 17, Bertie makes a contemporary reference to nuclear fission experiments:

I was reading in the paper the other day about those birds who are trying to split the atom, the nub being that they haven't the foggiest as to what will happen if they do. It may be all right. On the other hand, it may not be all right. And pretty silly a chap would feel, no doubt, if having split the atom he suddenly found the house going up in smoke and himself being torn limb from limb.

When stirred, Bertie Wooster sometimes unintentionally employs spoonerisms, as he does in chapter 12: "Tup, Tushy!—I mean, Tush, Tuppy!". Bertie occasionally uses a transferred epithet, using an adjective to modify a noun rather than using the corresponding adverb to modify the verb of the sentence, as in the following quote in chapter 17: "It was the hottest day of the summer, and though somebody had opened a tentative window or two, the atmosphere remained distinctive and individual".

Wodehouse often uses popular detective story clichés out of place for humorous effect, as in chapter 15: "Presently from behind us there sounded in the night the splintering crash of a well-kicked plate of sandwiches, accompanied by the muffled oaths of a strong man in his wrath".

Wodehouse frequently uses horse racing as a source of imagery. For example, Bertie describes how he, his Aunt Dahlia, and the butler Seppings rush to Anatole's room in chapter 20 in a parody of race-reporting. For instance, Bertie remarks that "I put down my plate and hastened after her, Seppings following at a loping gallop" and that at the top of the first flight of stairs, Aunt Dahlia "must have led by a matter of half a dozen lengths, and was still shaking off my challenge when she rounded into the second".

The humour in the speech of Aunt Dahlia's French cook Anatole comes from the combination of informal British and American expressions with real or imaginary loan translations from French. The most extensive example of Anatole's speech is his diatribe in chapter 20. To quote part of his speech: "Hot dog! You ask me what is it? Listen. Make some attention a little. Me, I have hit the hay, but I do not sleep so good, and presently I wake and up I look, and there is one who makes faces against me through the dashed window". Anatole is similar to Jeeves, being a highly competent servant whose loss is a constant threat, though Anatole, while mentioned frequently, does not make an appearance in any other story; this distance differentiates him from Jeeves.

Jeeves sometimes denigrates Bertie in ways which are too subtle for Bertie to perceive, but obvious to readers. For example, in chapter 3, when Bertie is puzzled after Aunt Dahlia invites him to Brinkley Court, since he has just spent a two-month vacation with her. Bertie says to Jeeves:

"But why, Jeeves? Dash it all, she's just had nearly two months of me.""Yes, sir.""And many people consider the medium dose for an adult two days.""Yes, sir. I appreciate the point you raise. Nevertheless, Mrs. Travers appears very insistent."

Jeeves's reply, "I appreciate the point you raise", carries an irony that Bertie apparently misses. However, since Jeeves invariably stays in Bertie's employ, the quote suggests that Jeeves puts up with and even enjoys Bertie's continuing society more than Bertie's friends and relatives do.

In the novel, Aunt Dahlia uses the expression "oom beroofen", which is derived from the German "unberufen" and means "touch wood" or "knock on wood". Wodehouse previously used "beroofen" in The Gem Collector (1909).

Background
The book is dedicated to Raymond Needham KC, "with affection and admiration". Needham had represented Wodehouse in a tax dispute case and won the case. According to Wodehouse scholar Richard Usborne, Needham had to talk Wodehouse out of using the original, more provocative dedication: "To Raymond Needham KC, who put the tax-gatherers to flight when they had their feet on my neck and their hands in my wallet" or words to that effect. Wodehouse actually befriended the tax inspector involved in the case.

Publication history
In the Saturday Evening Post, the story was illustrated by Henry Raleigh. The story was later printed in Men Only in April 1936. Along with The Inimitable Jeeves and Very Good, Jeeves, the novel was included in a collection titled Life With Jeeves, published in 1981 by Penguin Books.

Reception

 The Times (5 October 1934): "On the principle that 'spilt milk blows nobody any good,' Wooster, as usual, spills a few additional gallons of the milk of human imbecility, and awaits the consequences.  … When, at last, Jeeves clocks in, having resolved the initial discord to his own satisfaction, the young master pays the customary penalty for his good intentions—on this occasion a wholly futile bicycle ride of 18 miles in the dark. When he returns, Jeeves has done the trick, the place is stiff with happy endings, and Mr. Wodehouse has shown once again that all is for the funniest in the most ludicrous of worlds".
 Gerald Gould, The Observer (21 October 1934): "Of the immortal Mr. Wodehouse, creator of the immortal Jeeves, it remains only to say the ever-incredible and ever-true—'He gets better and better.' Whereas one used to smile, one now rocks and aches with laughter. "Right Ho, Jeeves" is, in the phrase its author applies to a mess jacket, 'one long scream from start to finish'".
 New York Times Book Review (28 October 1934): "Jeeves and Bertie Wooster here show up at their balmiest and best. Not to put too fine a point on the matter, "Brinkley Manor" is an authentic triumph, in the master's best manner. ... The hilarious Wooster thought, on the occasion this story celebrates, that Jeeves (first gentleman among the world's gentlemen's gentlemen) had sprained his brain. So he took a turn at straightening out people's lives. ... Fortunately, Jeeves went along too. As a matchmaker Bertie was industrious but terrible".
 In 1996, John Le Carré listed the work among his all-time favourite novels, stating: "No library, however humble, is complete without its well-thumbed copy of "Right Ho, Jeeves," by P.G. Wodehouse, which contains the immortal scene of Gussie Fink-Nottle, drunk to the gills, presenting the prizes to the delighted scholars of Market Snodsbury Grammar School".
 Stephen Fry, in an article titled "What ho! My hero, PG Wodehouse" (18 January 2000), remarks on the popularity of the work, especially the prize-giving episode: "The masterly episode where Gussie Fink-Nottle presents the prizes at Market Snodsbury grammar school is frequently included in collections of great comic literature and has often been described as the single funniest piece of sustained writing in the language. I would urge you, however, to head straight for a library or bookshop and get hold of the complete novel Right Ho, Jeeves, where you will encounter it fully in context and find that it leaps even more magnificently to life." In late 2020, Fry would narrate the book and four others in a Jeeves audiobook for Audible. 
 Richard Usborne, in his book Plum Sauce: A P. G. Wodehouse Companion (2003), states that "the prize-giving is a riot, probably the best-sustained and most anthologised two chapters of Wodehouse".
 In a 2009 internet poll, Right Ho, Jeeves was voted number one in the "best comic book by English writer" category.
 In July 2012, Christian Science Monitor editors Peder Zane and Elizabeth Drake listed Right Ho, Jeeves as number ten in a list of the ten best comic works in all of literature.

Adaptations

Television
The story was adapted into the Jeeves and Wooster episodes "The Hunger Strike" and "Will Anatole Return to Brinkley Court?", which first aired on 13 May 1990 and 20 May 1990. There are some changes, including:
 In the original story, Jeeves' initially suggests Gussie gain the courage to propose to Madeline by dressing as Mephistopheles. The party invite subplot was removed from the TV series, but the costume later appears in "The Bassetts' Fancy Dress Ball".
 In the original story, Tom Travers has a pistol, which is never fired; in the first episode, he has a shotgun, which Bertie accidentally fires at a chandelier, after which Aunt Dahlia tells Bertie to go home. He returns to Brinkley Court in the following episode. 
 Anatole leaves Brinkley Court between the two episodes, and Jeeves is sent to convince him to return. 
 In the episode, Bertie does not find out that Jeeves spiked Gussie's drink until after he himself has done so. 
 In the original story, Gussie eventually chooses to drink alcohol, and also unknowingly drinks the spiked orange juice; in the episode, he only drinks the spiked orange juice. 
 While running away from Tuppy in the episode, Gussie does not end up on the roof, a scene depicted in the first edition cover artwork.
 In the original story, Bertie was obliged to ride his bicycle at night without a lamp, and it was not raining; in the episode, he has a lamp, but it is raining heavily.

Radio

In the 1956 BBC Light Programme dramatisation of the novel, Deryck Guyler portrayed Jeeves and Naunton Wayne portrayed Bertie Wooster.Right Ho, Jeeves was adapted into a radio drama in 1973 as part of the series What Ho! Jeeves'' starring Michael Hordern as Jeeves and Richard Briers as Bertie Wooster.

BBC radio adapted the story for radio again in 1988. David Suchet portrayed Jeeves and Simon Cadell portrayed Bertie Wooster.

References
Notes

Bibliography

External links 

 
 
 
 

Novels by P. G. Wodehouse
1934 British novels
British comedy novels
Works originally published in The Saturday Evening Post
Novels first published in serial form
Herbert Jenkins books